"Octopus's Garden" is a song by the English rock band the Beatles, written and sung by Ringo Starr (credited to his real name Richard Starkey), from their 1969 album Abbey Road. George Harrison, who assisted Starr with the song, commented: "Octopus's Garden' is Ringo's song. It's only the second song Ringo wrote, and it's lovely." He added that the song gets very deep into the listener's consciousness "because it's so peaceful. I suppose Ringo is writing cosmic songs these days without even realising it." It was the last song released by the Beatles featuring Starr on lead vocals.

Composition
The idea for the song came about when Starr was on a boat belonging to comedian Peter Sellers in Sardinia in 1968. He ordered fish and chips for lunch, but instead of fish he got squid (it was the first time he'd eaten squid, and he said, "It was OK. A bit rubbery. Tasted like chicken.") The boat's captain then told Starr about how octopuses travel along the sea bed picking up stones and shiny objects with which to build gardens. Starr's songwriting was further inspired by his desire to escape mounting hostility among the Beatles; he would later admit that he had "just wanted to be under the sea, too". Uncredited assistance in developing the song's chord changes was provided by Harrison, who can be seen helping Starr work the song out on piano, with Lennon later joining in with drums, in the documentaries Let It Be (1970) and The Beatles: Get Back (2021), both using the same footage.

The song, which contains the lyrics "Oh what joy for every girl and boy/Knowing they're happy and they're safe," is sometimes thought of as being a song for children, like "Yellow Submarine" or "All Together Now". It has also been performed by the Muppets several times in various episodes of their shows.

Recording
The basic instrumental track was recorded 26 April 1969, with the Beatles lineup of two electric guitars (Harrison and Lennon), bass guitar (McCartney) and drums (Starr). Starr also provided a temporary guide vocal on this date. (Take 2 of the recording, featuring this guide vocal, Starr singing the first verse three times, is track 14 on disc 2 of Anthology 3.) In the absence of George Martin, the Beatles themselves were listed as producer, with Martin's apprentice Chris Thomas present in the control room to assist. Thirty-two takes were required before the Beatles were satisfied with the track.

The backing vocals by McCartney and Harrison during the guitar solo were put through compressors and limiters to create a gurgling sound. At Starr's request, Harrison added the sound of bubbles by blowing through a straw into a glass of milk.

Personnel
According to Kevin Howlett:

 Ringo Starrdouble-tracked lead vocals, drums, percussion, bubbling effects
 John Lennonguitar
 Paul McCartneybacking vocals, bass guitar, piano
 George Harrisonbacking vocals, lead guitar

Remix in Love
The song was remixed in 2006 for the Beatles album Love, which contained remixes of classic Beatles songs. The remix begins with Starr's vocals over the orchestration from "Good Night", then transitions into the original instrumental backing track on the line "I'd ask my friends...", with sound effects from "Yellow Submarine" added in the background. During the guitar solo, the drum track is replaced with that of "Lovely Rita".

Book

In 2014, Starr wrote a children's book based on and named after the song. The book, which consists of the song's lyrics, is illustrated by Ben Cort. A CD is included with the book, including an introduction by Starr, a new version of the song, the lyrics spoken as prose, and an instrumental version of the song.

Other versions
Jim Henson's Muppets made 3 video cover versions of the song, on Sesame Street, episode 19 in 1969, The Ed Sullivan Show in March 1970, and The Muppet Show episode 312 in 1978, which was performed by Kermit the Frog, his nephew Robin the Frog, and Miss Piggy.

Reparata and the Delrons released the song as a single in 1972 on Dart records, backed with "Your Life Is Gone". It used vocal effects and ocean-themed sound effects to mimic the style of their 1968 UK hit, "Captain of Your Ship". It was re-released in 1976, with the A- and B-sides reversed, and credited to Reparata (no Delrons).

Noel Gallagher of Oasis adds adapted lyrics from "Octopus's Garden" to the end of their song "Whatever" during some of his live performances. The phrase "I'd like to be under the sea" is in the refrain of one of Oasis' most popular b-sides, "Take Me Away". Also, the refrain from the chorus of "Octopus's Garden" can be heard about forty seconds from the end of "The Masterplan", also by Oasis.

The song was covered and recorded by Canadian children's musician Raffi for the 1985 album One Light, One Sun.

Beatles cover band The Punkles did a punk cover on their fourth album For Sale sung by their drummer Markey Starkey.

Notes

External links

1969 songs
English children's songs
Music published by Startling Music
Novelty songs
Ringo Starr songs
Songs about invertebrates
Songs about oceans and seas
Song recordings produced by George Martin
Songs written by Ringo Starr
The Beatles songs
The Muppets songs